Coonabarabran Airport  is a small airport located  south of Coonabarabran, New South Wales, Australia.

Coonabarabran Airport appeared on an episode of Royal Flying Doctor Service on Monday 1 October 2007.

Coonabarabran Airport has a grass runway, 01/19 and a sealed runway 11/29. From 1991 to 2001 Yanda Airlines based an aircraft and pilots at the airport to provide 12 weekly commuter flights to Sydney via Gunnedah. Although Coonabarabran no longer has a passenger service, the airport is used by the local aeroclub regularly.

See also
List of airports in New South Wales

References

Airports in New South Wales